Lihue or Līhue is an unincorporated community, census-designated place (CDP) and the county seat of Kauai County, Hawaii, United States. Lihue (pronounced ) is the second-largest town on the Hawaiian island of Kauai after Kapaa. As of the 2010 census, the CDP had a population of 6,455, up from 5,694 at the 2000 census.

History 
In ancient times, Lihue was a minor village. Līhue means "cold chill" in the Hawaiian language. Lihue is in the ancient district of Puna, the southeastern coast of the island, and the land division (ahupuaa) of Kalapaki. Royal Governor Kaikioewa officially made it his governing seat in 1837, moving it from Waimea; he named the town after land he owned on Oahu by the same name.

With the emergence of the sugar industry in the 1800s, Lihue became the central city of the island with the construction of a large sugar mill. Early investors were Henry A. Peirce, Charles Reed Bishop and William Little Lee. The plantation struggled until William Harrison Rice built the first irrigation system in 1856.

Subsequent plantation owner Paul Isenberg helped German people emigrate to Lihue starting in 1881, with the first Lutheran church in Hawaii founded in 1883. Services were held in German well into the 1960s. By the 1930s, George Norton Wilcox became one of the largest sugarcane plantation owners, buying Grove Farm from Hermann A. Widemann. The Wilcox family home, Kilohana, has been converted into a restaurant and gift shop. The surrounding plantation now grows crops and livestock. A narrow-gauge tourist railroad with vintage diesel locomotives from Whitworth and General Electric offers tours of the plantation; horse-drawn carriage tours are offered as well. The grounds are also the site of luaus, many of which are offshore excursions booked through NCL America. Lihue also houses the Kauai Museum, which details the history of Kauai.

Geography and climate

Lihue is on the eastern side of the island of Kauai, bordered by Hanamaulu to the north and Puhi to the west. Its shorefront on the Kauai Channel of the Pacific Ocean extends from Hanamaulu Bay in the north to the larger Nawiliwili Bay to the south. Hawaii Route 50 leads west from Lihue  to Kalaheo and beyond to the western side of the island, while Hawaii Route 56 leads north  to Kapaa and onwards to the northern side of the island.

Lihue has a tropical wet and dry climate zone (Köppen classification As) with a relatively dry summer season.

The record driest month is February 1983 with trace amounts.

Demographics 

As of the census of 2000, there were 5,694 people, 2,178 households, and 1,420 families residing in the CDP. The racial makeup of the CDP was 22.8% White, 49.2% Asian, 0.2% Black or African American, 0.2% Native American, 6.4% Pacific Islander, 0.7% from other races, and 20.5% from two or more races. 6.5% of the population were Hispanic or Latino of any race.

There were 2,178 households, out of which 25.8% had children under the age of 18 living with them, 48.9% were married couples living together, 11.8% had a female householder with no husband present, and 34.8% were non-families. 29.9% of all households were made up of individuals, and 16.1% had someone living alone who was 65 years of age or older. The average household size was 2.55 and the average family size was 3.16.

In the CDP the population was spread out, with 22.8% under the age of 18, 5.2% from 18 to 24, 23.7% from 25 to 44, 25.8% from 45 to 64, and 22.4% who were 65 years of age or older. The median age was 44 years. For every 100 females, there were 92.2 males. For every 100 females age 18 and over, there were 90.6 males.

The median income for a household in the CDP was $44,906, and the median income for a family was $56,875 in 2000. Males had a median income of $38,713 versus $28,032 for females. The per capita income for the CDP was $22,619. 4.6% of the population and 1.7% of families were below the poverty line. Out of the total population, 1.4% of those under the age of 18 and 7.3% of those 65 and older were living below the poverty line.

Transportation
Lihue is served by Lihue Airport, in the eastern part of the community. Kauai's main seaport is at Nāwiliwili Bay, directly southeast of town. Lihue is also served by The Kauai Bus, a public bus system serving the entire island.

Facilities
The town is home to the county administration building; Kauai's largest shopping center, Kukui Grove Center, which houses the island's only big department store, Macy's; and several big-box stores, including Wal-Mart, Home Depot and Costco. There are also several car dealerships and restaurants.

Education 
Lihue is home to Kauai Community College, part of the University of Hawaii system.

Lihue is also served by the Hawaii Department of Education. Two K-5 elementary schools, Wilcox Elementary School in Lihue and Kaumualii Elementary School in downtown Hanamaulu serve the area. All of the area is zoned to Kamakahelei Middle School and Kauai High School.

Island School, a private pre-kindergarten to 12 school, is also located in Lihue.

Notable people 
 Bethany Hamilton (b. 1990) surfer
 Eric Shinseki, (b. 1942) retired United States Army general who served as 34th chief of staff of the Army and the seventh U.S. secretary of veterans affairs.
 Robert Yasuda (b. 1940) American abstract painter
 Kirby Yates (b. 1987) Major League Baseball pitcher
 Tyler Yates (b. 1977) former Major League Baseball pitcher

Notes

References

Census-designated places in Kauai County, Hawaii
Populated places on Kauai
County seats in Hawaii
Populated coastal places in Hawaii